Maull is a surname. Notable people named Maull include:

Henry Maull (1829–1914), British photographer 
January Maull (1800s), state legislator in Alabama during the Reconstruction era
Joseph Maull (1781–1846), American physician and Governor of Delaware
Otto Maull (1887–1957), German geographer and geopolitician

See also
Maul (disambiguation)
Surnames from nicknames